The 1988 CFL Draft composed of eight rounds where 64 Canadian football players were chosen from eligible Canadian universities and Canadian players playing in the NCAA. This was the first draft not to feature a Montreal franchise, as the Alouettes had folded just before the start of the 1987 regular season. This was also the first national draft to feature only eight teams.

1st round

2nd round

3rd round

4th round
25. Winnipeg Blue Bombers                        Brad Tierney              OL                        Acadia

26. Ottawa Rough Riders                          Sheridon Baptiste  WR/HB  Queen's

27. Hamilton Tiger-Cats                          Burt Cummings  WR/CB  North Dakota

28. Calgary Stampeders                           Wally Zatylny  WR  Bishop's

29. Winnipeg Blue Bombers                        Michael Allen  CB/RB  Carleton

30. British Columbia Lions                       Warren Robinson  T  York

31. Toronto Argonauts                            Floyd Salazar  CB/HB  McGill

32. Edmonton Eskimos                             Todd Middleton  ILB  Dickinson State

5th round
33. Ottawa Rough Riders                          Sieg Will  T/DE  Guelph

34. Ottawa Rough Riders                          Christopher Rick          OLB                       Queen's

35. Hamilton Tiger-Cats                          Jeff MacDonald  S  New Mexico State

36. Calgary Stampeders                           Jeff Yausie  TB  Saskatchewan

37. Saskatchewan Roughriders                     John Hoffman  TB/P  Saskatchewan

38. British Columbia Lions                       Carl Ljungberg            P/K                        Guelph

39. Toronto Argonauts                            Chris Munford             S                          Simon Fraser

40. Edmonton Eskimos                             Greg Kratzer              WR                         Dickinson State

6th round
41. Ottawa Rough Riders                          Brent Matich  P/K  Calgary

42. Saskatchewan Roughriders                     Darrell Harle  T  Eastern Michigan

43. Hamilton Tiger-Cats                          John Yach                OLB/DE                        Queen's

44. Calgary Stampeders                           Steve Watts  CB/S  Toronto

45. Winnipeg Blue Bombers                        Matt Fitzpatrick  DE  British Columbia

46. British Columbia Lions                       Dave Johnson  LB  Simon Fraser

47. Toronto Argonauts                            Tim Karbonick             SB/TE                        Calgary

48. Edmonton Eskimos                             Terry Ainge               TB                           British Columbia

7th round
49. Ottawa Rough Riders                          Scott Warr                T                            McGill

50. Saskatchewan Roughriders                     Hugh Alexander  T  Utah

51. Hamilton Tiger-Cats                          Bob Frenkel               NG  Arizona State

52. Calgary Stampeders                           Jordan Gagner             QB                         British Columbia

53. Winnipeg Blue Bombers                        Rob Deluca                P/K  McMaster

54. British Columbia Lions                       Tony Mandarich  T  Michigan State

55. Toronto Argonauts                            Frank Paradiso            ILB                        York

56. Edmonton Eskimos                             Stephen Kasowski          P/K/WR  Alberta

8th round
57. Ottawa Rough Riders                          Ray Goerke  T  Weber State

58. Saskatchewan Roughriders                     Floyd Collins  TB  Boise State

59. Hamilton Tiger-Cats                          Michael Carrier  TB  Western Kentucky

60. Calgary Stampeders                           Ian James  OLD  Calgary

61. Winnipeg Blue Bombers                        Jim Taplin                FB                         Acadia

62. British Columbia Lions                       Tom Vlasic                TE                         British Columbia

63. Toronto Argonauts                            Jamie Williamson          HB                         York

64. Edmonton Eskimos                             Neil Ferguson  DB  Alberta

References
Canadian Draft

Canadian College Draft
Cfl Draft, 1988